You Have to Come and See It is a 2022 Spanish film written and directed by Jonás Trueba. It stars Itsaso Arana, Vito Sanz, Francesco Carril and Irene Escolar.

Plot 
Over the course of a little more than 60 minutes, with an ellipsis cutting the film in Winter and Spring, the plot tracks the conversations of two couples of friends past their thirties. It starts with the characters attending to a musical piece by Chano Domínguez at Madrid's Café Central.

Cast

Production 
Produced by Los Ilusos Films, the film had the collaboration from the Ayuntamiento de Madrid and the Madrid regional administration.

Release 
Distributed by Atalante, the film was theatrically released in Spain on 17 June 2022. It also screened at the 56th Karlovy Vary International Film Festival's official competition in July 2022. It will have its North-American premiere at the 2022 New York Film Festival. It also made it to 'World Cinema' section of 27th Busan International Film Festival to be screened in October 2022.

Reception 
According to the review aggregation website Rotten Tomatoes, You Have to Come and See It has a 100% approval rating based on 7 reviews from critics, with an average rating of 8.3/10.

Quim Casas of El Periódico de Catalunya rated the film 4 out of 5 stars, deeming it to be, short of being an overly political film, "frank, direct, fluid, somewhat sad, well built around its four performers and with a beautiful experimental coda". Beatriz Martínez of Fotogramas rated the film 5 out of 5 stars, pointing out that Trueba displays "the unusual ability to capture a state of mind", with the film underpinning, in addition to a letter of love to cinema, "the best X-ray yet of the feeling of limbo in the aftermath of the [COVID-19] pandemic". Andrea G. Bermejo of Cinemanía scored 4 out of 5 stars, determining the film to be, out of all Trueba's works, the one connecting the most with the real, underscoring as a bottom line: "like a day in the country with friends. Pure enjoyment". Reviewing for Deadline, Anna Smith assessed that the film features "a simple but effective set up; a characterful ramble powered by four terrific performances and witty dialogue rooted in the truth". Jessica Kiang of Variety deemed the film ("one of the late-breaking joys of the Karlovy Vary competition") to be "as sociable and swiggable as a draught or 10 of sweetly fortified wine". Javier Ocaña of El País considered that, depending on who looks at it and lives it, the film can be either "placid, bitter, lucid and enveloping", or "simply ironic, provocative and even comical. And maybe they are all right".

Top ten lists 
The film appeared on a number of critics' top ten lists of the best Spanish films of 2022:

Accolades 

|-
| align = "center" | 2022 ||  || colspan = "2" | Special Jury Prize ||  || align = "center" | 
|-
| rowspan = "1" align = "center" | 2023 || rowspan = "1" | 10th Feroz Awards || colspan = "2" | Best Comedy Film ||  || rowspan = "1" | 
|}

See also 
 List of Spanish films of 2022

References 

Spanish comedy-drama films
2022 comedy-drama films
2020s Spanish-language films
Films set in Madrid
2020s Spanish films